The Lawrance A-3 or Lawrance Model A was an American twin-cylinder aircraft piston engine. Designed by Charles Lawrance in the mid-1910s the engine was produced by the Lawrance Aero Engine Company and under license by Excelsior. Weighing 200 lb (90 kg) the engine produced 28 horsepower (21 kW). A feature of this engine was the shared use of a single crankpin for both cylinders, this caused vibration as the pistons moved in the same direction.

Applications
Breese Penguin (flightless ground training aircraft)
Driggs Dart
Mummert Cootie
Shinnecock lightplane
Swanson SS-3
Waco Cootie I (monoplane)
Waco Cootie II (biplane)

Engines on display
A Lawrance A-3 is on public display at the Aerospace Museum of California

Specifications

See also

References

Notes

Bibliography

Gunston, Bill. World Encyclopaedia of Aero Engines. Cambridge, England. Patrick Stephens Limited, 1989. 

1910s aircraft piston engines
A-3